Nicole Renee Taylor (born March 5, 1975) is an American supermodel and television hostess.

Early life
Taylor was born in Fort Lauderdale, Florida, to Ken and Barbara Taylor, a highway patrol lieutenant and a photographer, respectively. She was raised in Pembroke Pines, Florida, and attended Cooper City High School. She has an older sister, Joelle, and had a younger sister, Krissy (1978–1995).

Modeling career
When she was 13, Taylor signed with Irene Marie Models in South Florida. There she met photographer Jean Renard, who later became her manager. She subsequently won a Fresh Faces contest in New York City and a $500,000 modeling contract. Taylor's first magazine cover was an issue of Seventeen (August 1989) at 14. The following year, at 15, she was photographed for the cover of Vogue, becoming the second youngest person to appear on the cover of the magazine, after Brooke Shields.

In 1991, at the age of just 16, Taylor became the youngest person ever to be featured as one of People magazine's Most Beautiful People, wearing a bright-orange one-piece bathing suit with long lime-green gloves in the photo spread which accompanied the article, taken on a Miami beach. The following year, Taylor became the first spokesmodel younger than 18 to sign a major contract with CoverGirl, and she became a feature in their national advertising campaign. Some of her other ad campaigns have been for Thierry Mugler, Escada, Liz Claiborne, Jean Paul Gaultier, Versace, Versus, Anne Klein, L'Oréal, Gap, Lee Jeans, and Pantene. Taylor remains the only person to simultaneously have six enormous billboards in NYC's Times Square, three of which displayed her image continuously throughout the entire year.

In May 1996, Taylor appeared on the covers of the six major American women's fashion and fitness magazines in the same month: Allure, Vogue, ELLE, Marie Claire, Self, and Shape. A first in history, this was named the 'Niki Six'. She appeared in the 1997 and 1998 editions of the Sports Illustrated Swimsuit Issue, and was the cover-model of the 1998 Sports Illustrated swimsuit calendar. Sports Illustrated released three video segments of her photo shoots, for the years 1997, 1998 and 1999. The 1997 segment was with one other model, Naomi Campbell, the 1998 segment was with two other models, and the 1999 segment was dedicated to Taylor alone.

In September 2016, Taylor began a modeling comeback which has seen her return to the top tier of industry again, shooting covers, editorials and features for major magazines including Paper, Flaunt, British Vogue, Harper's Bazaar, and American Vogue. She has been shot for Marc Jacobs, Jennifer Fisher.

In September 2017, Taylor was a fixture in the fashion and mainstream press, her personal style earning her best dressed titles in Vanity Fair, Vogue, Hello! magazine, and WWD.

In April 2021, Taylor became the face of CoverGirl again after her last contract ended in 2000.

Other ventures
Outside of modeling, Taylor was once an interviewer for segments of the syndicated program Lifestyles of the Rich and Famous. She also covered events for NBC and guest-hosted MTV's Fashionably Loud.

In the fall of 2005, Taylor launched her first fragrance, "Begin by Niki Taylor." She also founded the Begin Foundation for the Advancement of Women in Business. In 2007,  Taylor introduced the finalists on friend and co-CoverGirl spokesmodel Tyra Banks's talkshow. Taylor and male model Tyson Beckford co-hosted the new Bravo series Make Me a Supermodel. It premiered on January 10, 2008. Although the show was renewed for a second season, Taylor did not return as co-host since she was pregnant during the filming of the second season.

Taylor became a contestant on the fourth edition of The Celebrity Apprentice on March 6, 2011. In the first task, Taylor was considered the star performer by her team, and was even rewarded $35,000 for her charity (American Red Cross) because of her efforts. On March 20, she became the third person to be fired. Taylor had been the project manager for her team's third task, and when they lost, she took accountability for their defeat, and did not even choose two people to come with her to the boardroom, wishing to not instigate any conflict within her team. Donald Trump commented how he had a lot of respect for Taylor to take responsibility for the loss, but he still fired her. She returned for the May 1, 2011, episode to help the Men's Team, Team Backbone, in a Hair Show Task.

Personal life
A few months after graduating from high school in the spring of 1993, Taylor met former Miami Hooters linebacker Matt Martinez during a coin-toss at an arena football game in Miami.  Three months later, in January 1994, they eloped to Las Vegas. On July 19, 1994, a 4-months-pregnant Taylor married Martinez in a more traditional wedding ceremony in McCammon, Idaho.  In December 1994, the couple had twin sons, Jake and Hunter. Less than two years later, Taylor and Martinez divorced.

In October 2006, Taylor became engaged to NASCAR driver Burney Lamar after just three dates.  They met at an autograph session in January 2006. Their wedding was on December 27, 2006, at the Grande Colonial Hotel in La Jolla, California. Instead of gifts, the couple asked for donations to be sent to Victory Junction Gang Camp, a camp for chronically ill children in North Carolina.

Taylor and Lamar's first child together, daughter Ciel Taylor Lamar, was born on March 4, 2009, one day before Taylor's 34th birthday. On November 16, 2011, Taylor gave birth to her second child with Lamar, a son named Rex Harrison Lamar.

Taylor has returned to a high-profile life and career again, appearing at major fashion events and New York Fashion Week shows, both with friends and also with her family.

Health struggles
On April 29, 2001, Taylor was critically injured in a car accident in Atlanta, Georgia. The driver, her then boyfriend Chad Renegar, was attempting to answer his cell phone when he lost control of the car and smashed into a utility pole. Taylor was wearing her automatic shoulder belt at the time, and she was not thrown from the vehicle. However, she suffered severe internal injuries, including a collapsed lung and serious liver damage, and two steel rods had to be implanted in her back to hold her spine together. The accident left her unconscious and in a coma for six weeks and then bedridden for an additional month. She was treated at Grady Memorial Hospital in Atlanta and had approximately 56 operations and substantial physical therapy.

References

External links
 
 
 

1975 births
Living people
Female models from Florida
Participants in American reality television series
People from Fort Lauderdale, Florida
People from Pembroke Pines, Florida
Racing drivers' wives and girlfriends
The Apprentice (franchise) contestants
21st-century American women